was Governor of Okinawa Prefecture (1908–1913).

References

Further reading 
 Hata Ikuhiko, ed. "日本官僚制総合事典：1868 – 2000" (Comprehensive Encyclopedia of the Japanese Bureaucracy), Tōkyō Daigaku Shuppankai, 2001.

1848 births
1926 deaths
People from Mie Prefecture
Governors of Okinawa Prefecture